Francisco Aparicio y Ruiz (17 July 1852, Burgos — 6 November 1932, Burgos) was a Spanish lawyer and politician.

He studied and was educated in Madrid. In his youth he was a director of his local newspaper, Caput Castellae. He was a member of the Conservative Party, provincial deputy for Burgos in 1888, president of the Provincial Delegation of Burgos in 1890, Director General of Local Administration in 1899 and Deputy Secretary of Finance in 1900, Regional Commissioner of the Treasury in 1918 and Governor of Madrid in 1919. He was a member of the Congress for Burgos from 1891 to 1923 and also served as Vice-President of Congress from 1901 to 1910. He was Minister of Public Instruction between 13 March and 14 August 1921 in the government presided over by Manuel Allendesalazar Muñoz and reign of Alfonso XIII.

Further details about his life and death are unknown.

References

Government ministers of Spain
1852 births
1936 deaths
People from Burgos